Rototuna is a suburb in northern Hamilton, New Zealand, east of Flagstaff.  It is one of the newest and fastest-growing suburbs in Hamilton, along with neighbouring Huntington and Flagstaff.

Sometimes the name Rototuna is used to collectively refer to all of the city north of Wairere Drive and east of the Waikato River, including Flagstaff, St Petersburg, Magellan Rise, Ashmore, Somerset Heights, St James, Callum Brae and Huntington.

Although many Hamilton City publications say it was built on what was previously the bed of an ancient lake of which Rototuna was a tiny remnant, Lake Tunawhakapeka was to the north in Horsham Downs. However, its alternative name of Lake Rototuna, was the inspiration for the name given to a new post office in 1907 and later adopted for the area.

History 
Carbon dating of 1550 to 1625 was put on charcoal from a cultivation ground, which was uncovered on the corner of Hukanui Road and Wairere Drive in 1999.

Until around 1915 Rototuna Lake was described as "an ornament", but by 1919 it had been largely drained. It lay to the north of Rototuna, in Horsham Downs. Further drainage was done in 1926 and the lake bed was given to surrounding farms in 1928. It remained as Lake E, more recently given its original name of Lake Tunawhakapeka, where the peat deposits date back over 17,000 years. Like most of Waikato it would have been inundated by a flood of water and ignimbrite debris from Lake Taupo about 22,000 years ago. Lake Tunawhakapeka is said to have been .

Like most of western Waikato the land at Rototuna was confiscated following the 1863 invasion of the Waikato. It was surveyed into 50-acre parcels as grants to militiamen of the Fourth Waikato Regiment. By 1880 enough farmers had settled to be worth forming a school committee for the 30 children, which opened as Kirikiriroa School in 1881. The school was renamed Rototuna in 1907 and enlarged in 1914. More development came in the 1900s, with a post office and a church in 1907, a store in 1910, a casein factory in 1913 and a grocery and butcher in 1914. Rototuna Road was gravelled in 1909, but it was still muddy enough to cause a death in 1916 and complaints were still being made in 1920. Electricity came to the area about 1922. The post office was replaced by rural delivery before 1926. Another church opened in 1931 and a hall was open at about the same time. The school closed between 1944 and 1963. Its site is now occupied by a church. The old dairy factory was used as a chocolate factory until 2017.

Geography 
Rototuna is mainly in the Kirikiriroa Stream valley.

Demographics 

Rototuna had a population of 13,791 at the 2018 New Zealand census, an increase of 1,950 people (16.5%) since the 2013 census, and an increase of 6,654 people (93.2%) since the 2006 census. There were 4,311 households, comprising 6,693 males and 7,098 females, giving a sex ratio of 0.94 males per female, with 3,408 people (24.7%) aged under 15 years, 2,559 (18.6%) aged 15 to 29, 6,189 (44.9%) aged 30 to 64, and 1,629 (11.8%) aged 65 or older.

Ethnicities were 63.6% European/Pākehā, 11.0% Māori, 2.5% Pacific peoples, 28.9% Asian, and 4.4% other ethnicities. People may identify with more than one ethnicity.

The percentage of people born overseas was 36.9, compared with 27.1% nationally.

Although some people chose not to answer the census's question about religious affiliation, 45.0% had no religion, 36.9% were Christian, 0.5% had Māori religious beliefs, 4.6% were Hindu, 3.1% were Muslim, 1.4% were Buddhist and 3.4% had other religions.

Of those at least 15 years old, 3,339 (32.2%) people had a bachelor's or higher degree, and 1,320 (12.7%) people had no formal qualifications. 2,322 people (22.4%) earned over $70,000 compared to 17.2% nationally. The employment status of those at least 15 was that 5,592 (53.9%) people were employed full-time, 1,425 (13.7%) were part-time, and 357 (3.4%) were unemployed.

Rototuna's population has risen rapidly, from 453 in 1996 to 13,791 in 2018. Its median income remains above the national median, but the median age in the northern areas is below the national median age of 37.4 years in 2018.

In 2018 the main ethnic groups were -

For censuses prior to 2018 Rototuna was formed of census areas for Rototuna (in 2018 largely renamed Rototuna South) and Horsham Downs (in 2018 forming Rototuna North and Central). Growth was initially to the south, then the north.

The population has grown in Rototuna North, Central and South as in this table -

Facilities and Attractions 
Rototuna has three shopping centres. Rototuna Shopping Centre has a New World supermarket, a BP petrol station, KFC, and Good Neighbour bar/restaurant.

St James Shopping Centre offers a Countdown supermarket, a Domino's Pizza outlet, a gym, McDonald's Restaurant and Palmers Planet Garden Centre.

The recently completed mixed-use development called Rototuna Village is a mixture of retail, hospitality, office and high end apartments. Tenants include - Lonestar, Harcourts Real Estate, Pita Pit, Liquorland, as well as a Fruit and Vege, Nutrition and specialty butcher.

Future plans for a Rototuna "town-centre" is included in council planning. This is to be located at the corner of Resolution Drive & Borman Road. It is likely to include community facilities such as a library and possibly a pool - although both of these may be shared with the High Schools. $24m was proposed for library, pool and sports fields in the 2018 plan. Completion is planned by 2022.

Parks 
Four large parks are being developed. Mangaiti Park, Te Manatu Park, Hare Puke Park and Rototuna Sports Parks. Construction started at the Sports Park in 2018. It was renamed Korokori Park in 2019 and officially opened in 2020. It will have 5 pitches by 2021. Hare Puke Park playground opened in 2018, with a theme of eels and the hinaki used to catch them. Plans for Mangaiti Park Te Manatu Park were developed in 2015 and a playground opened at Mangaiti in 2019. There are also smaller parks at Eden Park Reserve, Moonlight Drive Reserve, Rototuna Park, Te Awa O Katapaki Esplanade, Te Toe Toe Reserve and Wiltshire Drive Reserve.

Infrastructure

Roads 
Rototuna roads have been enlarged from the previous country lane network since 2001, when the southern part of Resolution Drive was gazetted. Extension to Borman Road cost $1.4m in 2004. To be completed in 2021, Resolution Drive extension will link Rototuna to the Waikato Expressway to the north and the ring road at Wairere Drive to the south. The  extension will cost $9.8m and a benefit–cost ratio of 4.1% is expected. East–west links are being provided by extension of Borman Rd (in 2006 it cost $840,000 to extend it to Cate Road) and North City Rd at a further cost of about $21m. All have two lanes and roundabouts.

The main traffic flows are on the north–south roads; Gordonton, Horsham Downs and Resolution, with lesser flows east–west on Thomas Road.

Buses 
Buses on the Orbiter route serve Rototuna at 15 minute intervals. The Orbiter route was lengthened to serve Rototuna in 2009. The Rototuna Circular bus has provided a half hourly service since 2018. Bus 16 has linked Rototuna to the Transport Centre on a circuitous route via Callum Brae, at half hourly intervals, since 2018. Prior to 2009 that route was largely served by a Northerner bus from Chartwell. School routes to St Paul's, Southwell, Peachgrove Intermediate, Hamilton Boys' High and Sacred Heart were added in 2016.

Cycleways 
 wide shared paths are being built beside Resolution Drive and Borman Rd and $1m is being spent on cycleways, mostly running north–south on the eastern edge of Rototuna.

Water 
A 24 million litre reservoir opened at Kay Rd, beside the Expressway, in 2017. It is connected to the city's mains pipe network.

Education 

Rototuna Primary opened in 2003 and Te Totara opened in 2008.

Rototuna Junior High School opened in early 2016 for the start of the school year which serves Years 7 to 10. It cost $40m to build the school for 1,200 pupils. Rototuna Senior High School opened in early 2017 for the start of the school year which serves Years 11 to 13. The Junior & Senior high schools are based on the same grounds and share some facilities.

Waikato Waldorf School is a state integrated school providing Waldorf education from kindergarten to Year 10. The school opened in 1996.

All these schools are coeducational. Rolls are as of 

There are also many early childhood centres throughout the suburb.

See also
List of streets in Hamilton
Suburbs of Hamilton, New Zealand

References

External links 

 Photo of Flaxdale about 1905

Suburbs of Hamilton, New Zealand